The 2019 Mendip District Council election took place on 2 May 2019 to elect members of Mendip District Council in England. As Mendip District councillors are elected on a 4-year term, the next election is due to take place in 2023.

Election results

Ward results
The ward results listed below are based on the changes from the 2015 elections not taking into account any party defections or by-elections. Sitting councillors are marked with an asterisk (*).

Ammerdown

Ashwick, Chilcompton and Stratton

Beckington and Selwood

Butleigh and Baltonsborough

Chewton Mendip and Ston Easton

Coleford and Holcombe

Cranmore, Doulting and Nunney

Creech

Croscombe and Pilton

Frome Berkley Down

Frome College

Frome Keyford

Frome Market

Frome Oakfield

Helen Elaine Sprawson-White was elected as a Liberal Democrat in 2015 and rejoined the party in 2020.

Frome Park

Glastonbury St Benedict's

Robert Stephen Henderson was elected as a Conservative in 2015.

Glastonbury St Edmund's

Glastonbury St John's

Glastonbury St Mary's

Moor

Postlebury

Rode and Norton St. Philip

Rodney and Westbury

Shepton East

Bente Height was elected as a Conservative in 2015.

Shepton West

St Cuthbert Out North

Street North

Street South

Bryan Beha was elected as a Liberal Democrat in 2015.

Street West

The Pennards and Ditcheat

Wells Central

Wells St Cuthbert's

Wells St Thomas'

Wookey and St Cuthbert Out West

By-elections

Wells St. Thomas

A by-election was held in Wells St Thomas’ ward after the resignation of Liberal Democrat councillor Caroline McKinnell. Due to an error in their nomination papers, the Liberal Democrats failed to defend the seat.

Butleigh and Baltonsborough

References

2019 English local elections
May 2019 events in the United Kingdom
2019
2010s in Somerset